NLD may refer to:

 National Landcare Directory, a directory of Australian landcare
 National League for Democracy, a political party in Myanmar (Burma)
 National League for Democracy (Tanzania), a political party in Tanzania
 Necrobiosis lipoidica diabeticorum, a skin disorder
 Nonverbal learning disorder
 Novell Linux Desktop
 North London derby
 Quetzalcóatl International Airport (IATA airport code NLD; ICAO airport code MMNL), in Nuevo Laredo, Tamaulipas, Mexico
 The Netherlands (ISO 3166-1 alpha-3 country code NLD)
 Dutch language (ISO 639-3 language code nld)

See also

 NLDS